The Carroll Pioneers football program is a college football team that represents Carroll University in the Midwest Conference, a part of NCAA Division III.  The team has had 27 head coaches since its first recorded football game in 1896. The current coach is Mark Krzykowski who first took the position for the 2011 season.  Former head coach Matty Bell was elected to the College Football Hall of Fame in 1955.

Key

Coaches

Details
The following are details on coaches that do not have articles on Wikipedia.  For coaches with articles on Wikipedia, see links in the table above.

Ward A. Wescott

Playing history

Oconto Eleven
Wescott played for the Oconto, Wisconsin town team in 1895 and played a game against the team that would become the Green Bay Packers.  Wescott was both a player and trainer, receiving accolades for his abilities to teach the game as well as to play.

Coaching history

Carroll College
Wescott was the second head coach at Carroll and he held that position for the 1896 season. Preliminary reports predicted a "lively" season.  Wescott's players were predicted as promising before the season began.

Controversy was stirred up after a game against Milwaukee East High School on October 17, 1896.  Carroll won the game 4-0, but the opposing team disputed the result.  The next season's game was cancelled because Carroll was regularly using "ringers" or players that were brought in to the team from outside the school specifically to win games.

High school
Wescott later went on to coach the successful Eau Claire, Wisconsin high school team in 1902.

J. G. Britton
Britton was the head coach during a game witnessed by Miss Anna Sackett, who found the game to be so brutal that she revoked $5,000 (a sizeable sum at the time) from her will that had been bequested to Carroll College.  She claimed that the "players were brutes" and would no longer support the school if they continued play.  Later that same year (October 29), she died and left none of the funds to the college.

Charles C. Boone

While Boone was the coach, college president William Arthur Ganfield boasted that within four years' time Carroll would be beating the Wisconsin Badgers in football. In his one year of coaching, the team fell far short of that mark with its one win for the season and was outscored by 119 to 14 and left fans and the school administration sorely disappointed.

Vincent P. Batha

Athletics

Playing history
Batha played tackle for Carroll.  The school honored his legacy by inducting him into their "Hall of Fame" in 1973 as a "charter member" of the group.

Coaching history
Batha later became the 16th head football coach for his alma mater and he held that position for the 1931 season.  His career coaching record at Carroll College was 1 win, 4 losses, and 1 tie.  This ranks him 26th at Carroll College in total wins and 25th at Carroll College in winning percentage.  He would remain with the program as assistant coach under Glenn Thistlethwaite beginning in 1932.  Coach Batha's poor performance was called the worst start in seven years for the program, which was attributed to weakness at the end positions and turnover in the backfield.

Batha also was the head basketball coach at Carroll from 1931 until 1934, posting the 12th-most wins at the history of the school (as of 2007-2008 season) with a record of 29-13.  He also was assistant Athletic Director and head coach of the track and field and cross country running teams.

Academics
While at Carroll, Batha also was an instructor of physics, mathematics, and physical education.  Carroll college set up a memorial carillon in his memory.  One of his greatest joys was helping young men succeed in college and life.

Batha earned a Master of Science from the University of Wisconsin in 1929 and completed research on platinum and its reflective power as varied by temperature.

During World War II, Batha served as a flight instructor at Carroll for the United States Army Air Corps.  The eight-week curriculum consisted of mathematics, navigation, and aviation operation.  The program was coordinated through the college and taught at Waukesha County Airport.

Personal life
Batha was very active in the Boy Scouts of America and was awarded the Silver Beaver in 1949.  He was also active with the Kiwanis organization.  He was killed in an automobile accident on December 21, 1956.

Notes

References

Carroll Pioneers
 
Carroll Pioneers head football coaches